"River Below" is a song by the Canadian band Billy Talent. It was released in June 2004 as the third single from their self-titled debut studio album.

Track listing
CD
River Below (Album Version)
 Lies (Acoustic)

7" Vinyl
 River Below (Album Version)
Standing in the Rain (Acoustic)

DVD
River Below (Album Version)
Living in the Shadows (Live)
River Below (Video)
Try Honesty (Video)
EPK Footage

Music video
Sean Michael Turrell was the director of this video. The subject of the video for the song is a schizophrenic man who hears voices in his head compelling him to construct and detonate a bomb.  A photo of himself indicates that he was previously a member of the military during a war. While watching the television he sees bombs falling. Examples of insanity show the man trying to change the channel but it staying the same, newspaper headline clippings rearranging themselves forming various motivating phrases (i.e.: You will be famous!), and bomb blueprints becoming animated.  Billy Talent are shown playing in a garage in the house across the road from the man's, which appears to be cast somewhere around the 1960s, demonstrable by the clothing and technology; such as black and white television and the style of decor. The video is censored. In the original video, the bomb blows up showing an explosion, consuming the man and Billy Talent. In the MuchMusic edition, the bomb blows and there is a larger, more graphically visual, explosion. In a MuchMusic countdown, "Top 50 Most Controversial Videos," "River Below" made it to #7. It also placed #15 in MuchMusic's "100 Best Videos". The video was released after the 2004 Madrid train bombings; it caused outrage because it was after a deadly attack involving bombs.

Quotation at the beginning of the video

Oppenheimer was known as the 'Father of the Atomic Bomb', and this foreshadows the events that lead to the detonation of the bomb that the General has constructed.  However, it could also be treated as having much wider implications; suggesting that those with weapons, such as that shown in the video (i.e. warring countries), become the givers of death but on a scale that has a real potential of destroying the world.  The man is therefore only a representation of a greater danger, a microcosm of a possible scenario.

The quotation is actually that of Robert Oppenheimer quoting Vishnu from the Hindu scripture " Bhagavad Gita"

Chart performance

References

External links

Billy Talent songs
2004 singles
Songs written by Ian D'Sa
Songs written by Benjamin Kowalewicz
Songs written by Jonathan Gallant
Songs written by Aaron Solowoniuk
Song recordings produced by Gavin Brown (musician)
2003 songs